La Ferté-Saint-Aubin is a commune in the Loiret department in the administrative region of Centre-Val de Loire, France.

Geography
The commune is traversed by the Cosson river.

Population

Filming location
During February 1939, the Chateau de la Ferté-Saint-Aubin served as the exterior shooting location for the celebrated Jean Renoir movie La Règle du jeu ("The Rules of the Game").

See also
 Communes of the Loiret department
 Sologne

References

Fertesaintaubin
Orléanais